Iochroma lehmannii is a species of plant in the family Solanaceae. It is endemic to Ecuador, specifically in the Chimborazo Province in the High Andes. Its flowers are yellow-green.

References

lehmannii
Flora of Ecuador
Vulnerable plants
Taxonomy articles created by Polbot